The Patapsco Formation is a geologic formation of varigated clays, sandy clays, and sand in Virginia, the District of Columbia, Maryland, Delaware, Pennsylvania, and in the subsurface of New Jersey. It preserves fossils such as plants and molluscs dating back to the Cretaceous period.

See also

 List of fossiliferous stratigraphic units in Virginia
 List of fossiliferous stratigraphic units in Maryland
 Paleontology in Virginia
 Paleontology in Maryland

References

 

Cretaceous Maryland
Cretaceous geology of Virginia